Anette Natalia Vázquez Mendoza (born 11 March 2002), known as Anette Vázquez or her nickname, La Rata (the Rat), is a Mexican professional football midfielder who currently plays for Guadalajara (commonly known as Chivas) of the Liga MX Femenil, the first professional women's football league in Mexico. 
In 2017, she helped elevate Chivas to win the first professional women's football championship in the country in front of a record-setting 32,466 spectators. The team, with Vázquez as an important figure, won a league for a second time in the Torneo Clausura 2022 (Liga MX Femenil).  Vázquez also plays for the Mexico women's national under-20 football team and was selected for the 2022 FIFA U-20 Women's World Cup, where she scored the only Mexican goal in the game against New Zealand.

Playing career

Guadalajara, 2017–
Vazquez began playing for Guadalajara during the inaugural season of Liga MX Femenil. Vasquez scored the first-ever goal for the team. In July 2017, she scored the game-winning goal and helped the team win the inaugural Tapatío Women's Classic 3–0.

Honours

Club
Guadalajara
Liga MX Femenil: Apertura 2017

 Liga MX Femenil: Clausura 2022

References

External links
 
 Anette Vázquez at C.D. Guadalajara Femenil 

2002 births
Living people
Mexican women's footballers
Footballers from Jalisco
Liga MX Femenil players
C.D. Guadalajara (women) footballers
Mexico women's youth international footballers
Women's association football forwards
Mexican footballers